John O'Reilly (born 16 November 1930) is an Australian cricketer. He played seven first-class matches for New South Wales between 1953/54 and 1959/60.

See also
 List of New South Wales representative cricketers

References

External links
 

1930 births
Living people
Australian cricketers
New South Wales cricketers
Cricketers from Sydney